Rugby union in New Zealand is structured into four tiers. The top tier is composed of the national representative teams, with the men's team – known as the All Blacks – and the women's team - known as the Black Ferns, at the top, followed by other representative sides such as the Junior All Blacks and Māori All Blacks. These national sides are administered by the New Zealand Rugby Union (NZRU). Below this level is Super Rugby, where there are five New Zealand sides, each representing a different region of the country. Below this level is provincial rugby, the third tier – each province has a representative side that plays in either the semi-professional Bunnings Warehouse NPC, or amateur Heartland Championship. These provincial sides are selected of Super Rugby players, and club players from within the province. Club rugby is the fourth and lowest tier, and consists of clubs competing in local leagues organised by a provincial union.

There are 26 provincial unions and each administrates their own club competitions. Within these provinces there are over 520 clubs who are affiliated both to their province and the NZRU. The number of clubs in each province varies from six for the smallest unions such as West Coast to more than 30 for bigger unions such as Canterbury and Auckland. Many clubs pre-date the existence of the provincial or national unions.

Level 1: Bunnings Warehouse NPC
The National Provincial Championship (NPC) was founded in 1976.

The Bunnings Warehouse NPC, previously known as the Mitre 10 Cup, which was renamed from the ITM Cup after a 2016 sponsorship change, is fully professional and the competition usually runs from late July or early August to late October. From 2006, when the then Air New Zealand Cup replaced NPC division one, through to 2010, the competition contained 14 teams in a nationwide tournament. Starting with the 2011 season, the ITM Cup was split into two divisions, each with seven teams—the top-level Premiership and second-level Championship. Each division remained a nationwide tournament, although one that declined in perceived importance, as Ron Palenski described: "For all its success, the NPC is now seen as a lesser competition by New Zealand Rugby (formerly the New Zealand Rugby Union), which gives priority to the Super Rugby teams."

With the split into two divisions, promotion and relegation was reintroduced into the top level; the bottom side in the Premiership is relegated to the Championship and replaced by that division's champion.

In 2021, Bunnings Warehouse were named as the new sponsors for domestic rugby in New Zealand on a three year deal. They restructured the NPC with all 14 teams now united in the same division but now with two conferences called 'Evens' and 'Odds' which was derived from their previous final placing. The promotion and relegation that was present before was therefore removed.  

The previous season's playing schedule would remain of ten regular season games, with five each both home and away and four crossover matches involving randomly drawn opponents from the other conference alongside the other six teams in each team's own conference. As all fourteen teams are now in the same competition, they will now compete for a quarter-final berth as opposed to a semi-final berth previously. 

The current Bunnings Warehouse NPC teams, as of the 2022 season, are:

Odds Conference 
 Counties Manukau
 Hawkes Bay
 Otago
 Wellington
 Waikato
 Southland
 Bay of Plenty

Evens Conference 
 Manawatu
 Northland
 Taranaki
 Auckland
 Canterbury
 North Harbour
 Tasman

Level 2: Heartland Championship
The Heartland Championship is not fully professional. Like the Bunnings Warehouse NPC, the Heartland Championship is also a nationwide competition. The winners do not gain promotion to the NPC, so the Heartland Championship teams have remained the same since 2006. The Championship generally runs from late August to late October. The Heartland Championship contains 12 teams, 8 of which came from the NPC 3rd division in 2006 with the other already in the NPC 2nd division. The 12 teams in the Heartland Championship are:
 Buller
 East Coast (formerly NPC 2nd division)
 Horowhenua Kapiti
 King Country
 Mid Canterbury
 North Otago (formerly NPC 2nd division)
 Poverty Bay (formerly NPC 2nd division)
 South Canterbury
 Thames Valley
 Wairarapa Bush
 Wanganui (formerly NPC 2nd division)
 West Coast

Level 3 and below: Regional Leagues
The club season in New Zealand usually runs from March until late July or early August in any given year and amateur clubs compete on a regional basis. The sides play in intra provincial competitions against other teams from within their own provincial unions boundaries and this is the highest level of club play possible. There is no National club league, or nationwide competition for amateur club rugby.

Most of the 26 provincial unions have a number of divisions of club rugby within their province, particularly larger unions who may have as many as 6 or 7 tiers of club leagues. Some smaller Unions only have 1 division however. Some unions have promotion and relegation between their divisions, while in others, clubs are represented in several divisions, and in those cases, the players are promoted or demoted within their own club to/from that club's higher level team. Playing premier division one club rugby (also called "Seniors" in some provinces) in any union is the highest level of club rugby in New Zealand. In order to play in the Nationwide Representative competitions, The Bunnings Warehouse NPC and Heartland Championship players must be selected, usually due to their form during the club season which precedes the Provincial representative season. Therefore, a representative player will play both for a club and a provincial team in the same season. This is grassroots rugby.

The System

References